Michael Zullo (born 11 September 1988) is an Australian professional footballer who last played as a left-back for Sydney FC of the A-League.

Club career
After being signed by the former Brisbane Roar coach Frank Farina on a two-year contract, Zullo played five of the six opening games of the season, coming on as a substitute. On his first eleven debut against Wellington Phoenix, his sixth appearance for Queensland, he scored in the opening minutes of the game and set up a first half added-time goal for fellow youngster and close friend Robbie Kruse.
He previously played in the Brisbane Premier League for the Brisbane Strikers
During a match against Sydney FC, Zullo limped off the field with a torn thigh muscle which ruled him out for 6 weeks.

At the end of the 2008–09 season, Zullo received offers from Dutch Eredivisie clubs FC Groningen and NEC Nijmegen but declined both offers and cited his preference to stay in the A-League for another season.

On 2 April 2010, along with fellow Roar players, Thomas Oar and Adam Sarota, Zullo joined Dutch side Utrecht on a three-year deal, in a collective transfer deal rumoured to be worth in excess of A$1.8 million. He made his debut for Utrecht in a 1–1 draw with NEC Nijmegen on 28 February 2011, coming off the bench on the 81st minute.

On 29 August 2013, he signed a one-year loan deal with Australian A-League club Adelaide United.

On 14 July 2015, Zullo signed a one-year deal with Melbourne City.

On 11 May 2016, Zullo signed a two-year deal with Sydney FC. In his first season at the Sky Blues, he played an influential role as an attacking fullback, assisting three goals and forming a good partnership with left winger Miloš Ninković.

Zullo scored his first goal for Sydney FC in a 3–2 win over Wellington Phoenix.

In January 2018, Zullo committed his future to Sydney FC for a further two seasons.

On 16 May 2022, Zullo departed Sydney FC after six seasons with the club.

International career
Due to outstanding form since making his debut for Brisbane Roar, Zullo was called up for the first time for the Australia national under-23 football team before their qualifier against Iraq, in which they won 2–0.

He was also a train-on player with the national U-17 squad, the Joeys, at 2005 FIFA U-17 World Championship in Peru.

On 28 January 2009, Zullo made his full international debut, coming on as a substitute in a 0–0 draw with Indonesia in the group stage of qualifying for the 2011 AFC Asian Cup.

Personal life
Zullo has a younger brother, Julian, who appeared in Season 3 of football talent show Football Superstar on Australian television channel Fox8.
Zullo also attended Villanova College Coorparoo where he played for the 1st XI football team.
Zullo attended St Anthony's Primary School in Alexandra Hills.

Zullo and his wife Georgia have two children who are twins.

Career statistics
Statistics accurate as of 17 May 2022.

Honours

Club
Brisbane Strikers

 Brisbane Premier League Premiership: 2006
 Brisbane Premier League Championship: 2006

Sydney FC
A-League Premiership: 2016–17, 2017–18, 2019–20
A-League Championship: 2016-17, 2018–19, 2019–20
FFA Cup: 2017

Individual
PFA A-League Team of the Season: 2016–17

External links
 Brisbane Roar profile
 FFA - Olyroo profile
 First Goal against Wellington Phoenix on YouTube
 FC Utrecht profile

References

1988 births
Living people
People educated at Brisbane Boys' College
People educated at Villanova College (Australia)
Association football fullbacks
Soccer players from Brisbane
Australian soccer players
Brisbane Strikers FC players
A-League Men players
Brisbane Roar FC players
FC Utrecht players
Eredivisie players
Australian expatriate soccer players
Expatriate footballers in the Netherlands
Australia international soccer players
Brisbane City FC players
Australian people of Italian descent
Adelaide United FC players
Melbourne City FC players